Shōwa may refer to:

 Hirohito (1901–1989), the 124th Emperor of Japan, known posthumously as Emperor Shōwa
 Showa Corporation, a Japanese suspension and shock manufacturer, affiliated with the Honda keiretsu

Japanese eras
 Jōwa (Heian period) (承和), alternatively read as Shōwa, from 834 to 848
 Shōwa (Kamakura period) (正和), from 1312 to 1317
 Shōwa (1926–1989) (昭和), from 1926 to 1989

Japanese places
 Shōwa, Akita, a former town in Akita Prefecture
 Shōwa, Yamanashi, a town in Yamanashi Prefecture
 Shōwa, a former town in Tokyo, now part of Akishima, Tokyo
 Shōwa-ku, a ward of Nagoya, Aichi Prefecture
 Shōwa, Fukushima, a village in Fukushima Prefecture
 Shōwa, Gunma, a village in Gunma Prefecture
 Shōwa, Saitama, a dissolved town in Saitama Prefecture
 Showa Station (Antarctica), a Japanese research station located in Antarctica

Japanese educational institutions
 Showa University, in Tokyo
 Showa Women's University, in Tokyo
 Showa Pharmaceutical University (昭和薬科大学 Shōwa Yakka Daigaku), in Tokyo
 Showa Academia Musicae (昭和音楽大学 Shōwa Ongaku Daigaku), in Atsugi, Kanagawa Prefecture
 Showa Museum of Art (昭和美術館 Shōwa Bijitsukan), in Nagoya

Other uses
 Showa Era, the series of Godzilla movies ranging from 1954 to 1975.
 Shewa, also spelled Showa, a region of Ethiopia
 Showa (fish), a variety of ornamental koi (carp)
 Showa: A History of Japan, a manga by Shigeru Mizuki
 Shōwa, an album by The Gerogerigegege
 Shōwa, an album by Haruko Momoi